Özlem Araç (born May 26, 1989) is a Turkish female football manager and former women's football player. Currently, she coached 1207 Antalya Spor in the Women's First League.

Early years
Özlem Araç was born in Ankara, Turkey on May 26, 1989. She graduated in Physical Education and Sports from Gazi Universitz in Ankara specializing in football coaching.

Sports career

Player
Özlem Araç obtained her license from the Women's Regional League club Yeni Kapı Gençler Birliği in Antalya. She began paying after her transfer to the Ankara-based team Başkentgücü Spor in the 2009–10 season of the Regional League. She capped in 18 matches and scored one goal in two seasons. In the 2011–12 season, she played for Medical Park Antalyaspor in the Women's First League. She retired after one season, in which she played ten games and netted one goal.

Manager
Özlem Araç began her managerial career by July 2013 as assistant coach at the men's team Çankırıspor, which competed in the TFF Second League.

On September 30, 2014, she signed with her club a manager contract. She was successful to have her team, which was renamed to 1207 Antalya Spor, to finish the season 2014–15 in the Women's Second League as champion, and so get promoted to the Women's First League. She left 1207 Antalya Spor at the end of the regular season of the 2016–17 Women's First League before the play-off round.

Career statistics

Player

Manager
.

References

Living people
1989 births
Footballers from Ankara
Gazi University alumni
Turkish women's footballers
1207 Antalya Spor players
Turkish women's football managers
Çankırıspor
1207 Antalya Spor
Turkish sportswomen
Turkish female association football managers
Women's association footballers not categorized by position